Sam Beal (born August 30, 1996) is an American football cornerback who is a free agent. He played college football at Western Michigan, and high school football at Ottawa Hills High School.

High school career 
Playing at Ottawa Hills High School in Grand Rapids, Beal started on its varsity football team for three years and played on both sides of the ball. Aside from football, Beal garnered All-American honors his senior year in track and field. He committed to Western Michigan in late July 2014, favoring the college because he lived in Kalamazoo before high school. Beal was a two-star prospect.

College career 
A nose for contact turned Beal to the defensive side of the ball in college. He played as a true freshman in twelve games and logged 55 tackles as a sophomore. A breakout game against USC, which included an interception of Sam Darnold, highlighted Beal's junior season, which was marred by an injury that occurred in regulation of a seven-overtime game against Buffalo and kept him out of the following week's game against Akron. Following the season, Beal was named Second Team All-Mid-American Conference.

Beal considered entering the 2018 NFL Draft but decided to stay, citing a multitude of reasons. He was projected to go in the first round of the 2019 NFL Draft. Beal was named a preseason First Team All-MAC selection for the upcoming 2018 season. In June before his senior season, Beal applied to enter the 2018 NFL Supplemental Draft.

Professional career 

Beal was drafted by the New York Giants in the third round of the 2018 Supplemental Draft. On July 25, 2018, during training camp, Beal suffered a shoulder injury that would keep him out his entire rookie season. He was placed on injured reserve four days later.

On September 1, 2019, Beal was placed on injured reserve with a hamstring injury. He was designated for return from injured reserve and began practicing on October 16, 2019. He was activated on November 5.

On August 5, 2020, Beal announced he would opt out of the 2020 season due to the COVID-19 pandemic.

On November 9, 2021, Beal was waived from the active roster. On December 18, 2021, Beal was signed to the Giants practice squad. Beal was released on December 28, 2021.

Legal issues
On June 11, 2021, Beal pleaded guilty to a pair of gun charges stemming back to a June 2020 arrest in Ohio in which he was pulled over and a concealed weapon was discovered, and he was also cited for marijuana possession and a traffic violation. The plea put him on probation through June 2022.

References

External links 
 New York Giants bio
 Western Michigan Broncos bio

Living people
1996 births
Players of American football from Grand Rapids, Michigan
American football cornerbacks
Western Michigan Broncos football players
New York Giants players